Treaty of Fomena refers to the alliance of the Ashanti Empire in the time of Nana Mensa Bonsu and the British. It was formed in February 1874.  Others also claimed it was formed on 14 March 1874.

History 
In the nineteenth century, the British were the concerned with the Ashantis in the Gold Coast. The Ashantis invaded the coast about seven times in less than 70 years. Wolsely expedition launched by the British had to cross Pra river to race against the approaching rainy season. They entered Kumasi on 4 February. A battle occurred at a village near Bekwai called Amoafo. The Ashantis were defeated and both Bekwai and Kumasi were captured. The victory by the British and the Treaty put an end to the Asante's dream of bringing their power to the coastal states

Terms of the Treaty 

 The Ashantis promised to pay an amount of 50,000 ounces of Gold to the British.
 The Ashantis should renounce their claims on Assin, Akim, Adanse and Denkyira.
 They should also renounce claims to Elmina and other allies, and to all payments from the British Government for the use of forts.
 They are also to withdraw their troops from the South-West and other places.
 To also halt the practice of human sacrifice.

References 

Treaties of the United Kingdom
1870 treaties
Gold Coast (British colony)
Ashanti monarchs